Prokofiev most commonly refers to Sergei Prokofiev (1891–1953), Russian composer.

Prokofiev, Prokofyev or Prokofieff may also refer to:

Prokofiev (surname)
Prokofiev (song), 1991 song by The Damned
Prokofiev (crater), on Mercury
Sergei O. Prokofieff (Christian esotericist, grandson of Sergei Prokofiev)
Gabriel Prokofiev (Composer, grandson of Sergei Prokofiev)